Osman Jessop (3 January 1878 – 25 May 1941) was an English cricketer. He played for Gloucestershire between 1901 and 1911.

References

1878 births
1941 deaths
English cricketers
Gloucestershire cricketers
Sportspeople from Cheltenham